Larry Baker (1937–2000) is an American football player.

Larry Baker may also refer to:

Larry Baker (basketball) from Cleveland Cavaliers draft history
Larry Baker (politician) in 2004–08 Mississippi Legislature
Larry Baker (screenwriter) from The Flamingo Rising
Larry Baker, character in That Uncertain Feeling (film)

See also
Laurence Baker (disambiguation)
Lawrence Baker (disambiguation)